Dirtbox may refer to:

 Dirtbox (cell phone), a cell site simulator that mimics a cell phone tower, used by security agencies to collect information about phones
 One of several aliases of Ewan Pearson, an English electronic music producer